Krakow am See is an Amt in the district of Rostock, in Mecklenburg-Vorpommern, Germany. The seat of the Amt is in Krakow am See.

The Amt Krakow am See consists of the following municipalities:
Dobbin-Linstow
Hoppenrade
Krakow am See
Kuchelmiß
Lalendorf

Ämter in Mecklenburg-Western Pomerania
Rostock (district)